Seoul Sungrak Church is an Evangelical charismatic Church in Seoul, South Korea founded by Ki Dong Kim in 1969. With about 170,000 members (2009), it is one of the largest Baptist congregations in the world.

Pastor
Ki Dong Kim is a Korean Christian pastor and a poet. He is the Senior Overseer and Founder of Seoul Sungrak Church,. He has published four books of his poetry, and has been invited to international poetry festivals such as the XVIII International Poetry Festival of Medellín in 2008.

Writings

John N. Vaughan. The World's 20 Largest Churches (Grand Rapids, MI: Baker Book House, 1984), 71-75. 

John N. Vaughan. The Large Church (Grand rapids, MI: Baker Book House, 1985), 62. 

John N. Vaughan. Absolutely Double! (Bolivar, MO: Megachurch Research Press, 1990).

Ki Dong Kim with Jimi Miller. Semone (Shippenburg, PA: Treasure House, 1996).

References

External links
  Seoul Sungrak Church

Churches in Seoul
Charismatic churches